"Can You Feel My Heart" (stylized as "Can you feel my heart") is a song recorded by Japanese singer songwriter Mai Kuraki. It was released as the first promotional single from her thirteenth studio album Unconditional Love, through Northern Music for digital download on 21 April 2021. The song served as the opening theme song to the Japanese comedy-drama television series Love Comedy no Okite (2021). It is the first time in the last ten years that Kuraki writes a song for a television drama series, since she wrote "Strong Heart" (2021) for Hunter (2011).

Track listing

Charts

Daily charts

Weekly charts

Release history

References

2021 singles
2021 songs
Mai Kuraki songs
Songs written by Mai Kuraki
Song recordings produced by Daiko Nagato